Mike Grob (born May 6, 1964) is an American professional golfer. He attended the University of Arkansas and has been a member of the PGA Tour, Web.com Tour, and Canadian Tour.

Amateur career
Grob won the Montana Amateur in 1983, 1984, and 1985.

Web.com Tour
Grob spent 1999–2001 on what is now known as the Web.com Tour (then known as the Nike Tour (1999) and Buy.com Tour (2000–01)). His best finish was 2nd place at the 2000 Buy.com New Mexico Classic.

PGA Tour
Grob finished T34 at the 2002 PGA Tour Q-School which earned him his tour card for the 2003 PGA Tour season.

During the 2003 season, Grob made 14 cuts in 27 tournaments with two top-10 finishes. He earned $354,286 that season, which placed him 150th on the money list and gave him conditional status for the 2004 PGA Tour season. In the 2004 season, he entered 13 tournaments, made 5 cuts, and failed to retain his card for the 2005 PGA Tour season.

Canadian Tour
Grob played on the Canadian Tour in 2002 and from  2005 to 2012. He is the all-time money leader on the Canadian Tour. He is also a six-time winner on the Canadian Tour.

Professional wins (10)

Canadian Tour wins (6)

Other wins (4)
2006 Orange Lake Classic
2007 Bridgewater Classic, Rocksprings Classic, Sanctuary Ridge Open

See also
2002 PGA Tour Qualifying School graduates

References

External links

American male golfers
Arkansas Razorbacks men's golfers
PGA Tour golfers
PGA Tour Champions golfers
Golfers from Montana
Sportspeople from Billings, Montana
1964 births
Living people